The 2019 Clásica de San Sebastián was a road cycling one-day race that took place on 3 August in San Sebastián, Spain. It was the 39th edition of the Clásica de San Sebastián and the twenty-eighth event of the 2019 UCI World Tour. It was won by 19 year old Remco Evenepoel.

Teams
Twenty-two teams of seven riders were invited to take part in the race: all eighteen UCI WorldTeams and four UCI Professional Continental teams.

UCI WorldTeams

 
 
 
 
 
 
 
 
 
 
 
 
 
 
 
 
 
 

UCI Professional Continental Teams

Result

References

External links
 

2019
2019 UCI World Tour
2019 in Spanish road cycling
August 2019 sports events in Spain